Joseph Emmanuel Appiah, MP (16 November 1918 – 8 July 1990) was a Ghanaian lawyer, politician and statesman.

Biography
He was born in Kumasi to Nana James W.K. Appiah and Nana Adwoa Akyaa, members of the Ashanti imperial aristocracy. His father was a schoolmaster, Methodist leader, traditional nobleman and, finally, Chief Secretary of Asanteman - a position which gave him considerable influence in Ashanti affairs. Appiah was educated at Wesley College, Mfantsipim, and the Middle Temple.

During his time in the United Kingdom, he was closely involved with the West African Students' Union (WASU), eventually becoming its president. He came, through residence in London and involvement with WASU, to know many of the main players in the fight against imperial rule in Ghana and elsewhere in Africa. Not least among these was Kwame Nkrumah, to whom he became very close. Nkrumah was Appiah's first choice for best man at his wedding to Peggy Cripps in 1953 ("but the job went to arguably the more influential figure of George Padmore, a Trinidadian who was political mentor to African nationalist leaders, including Nkrumah and Jomo Kenyatta"). Their firstborn child, son Kwame, was born in London in 1954, followed by Ama (born 1955), Adwoa (born 1960) and Abena (born 1962).

The Appiah family returned to Ghana in late 1954. Soon after, Joe Appiah's close friendship with Kwame  Nkrumah was ruined, as he was more popular with the people than Nkrumah. Appiah was later imprisoned for many years by Nkrumah to prevent him from entering national politics. He joined the National Liberation Movement party and won the Atwima-Amansie seat in 1957. The NLM was later to merge with other opposition parties to form the United Party. After the General Afrifa-led coup that overthrew Nkrumah in 1966, he was asked to explain the new regime's motives to Ghana's friends and neighbours. Appiah was intermittently involved in public life as a diplomat and a government minister from then on until his retirement in 1978.

He returned to Kumasi, where he continued to fulfil his duties as a tribal elder. Following the death of his grand-uncle Yao Antony, he had become the head of their branch of the nobility of the Ashanti people. Prior to his own death, he served as the kingmaker and titular overlord of 
Nyaduom, a town that was founded centuries before by his ancestor Nana Akroma-Ampim I.

His autobiography Joe Appiah: The Autobiography of an African Patriot was published in 1990. Kwame Anthony Appiah's In My Father's House: Africa in the Philosophy of Culture was inspired by his father's easy cosmopolitanism.

Joe Appiah died in Accra after an illness and was buried at the Tafo cemetery at Kumasi in the Ashanti Region of Ghana. His widow would buy and occupy the adjacent plot after her death in 2006. His tomb was vandalised in 2008 by unknown persons.

Books

References

External links
Obituary

1918 births
1990 deaths
Deaths from cancer in Ghana
Ghanaian pan-Africanists
Mfantsipim School alumni
People from Kumasi
Ghanaian activists
Ghanaian MPs 1956–1965
Government ministers of Ghana
National Liberation Movement (Ghana) politicians
United Party (Ghana) politicians
Justice Party (Ghana) politicians
20th-century Ghanaian lawyers